Skjæveland is a Norwegian surname. Notable people with the surname include:

Anne Brit Skjæveland (born 1962), Norwegian heptathlete
Stian Heimlund Skjæveland (born 1973), Norwegian painter and sculptor

Norwegian-language surnames